Salix fruticulosa is a species of flowering plant in the willow family Salicaceae, native to Nepal, the eastern Himalayas, and Tibet. Although there may some confusion about which species of dwarf willow is intended, Salix fruticulosa is listed by the Royal Horticultural Society as available from commercial suppliers.

References

fruticulosa
Flora of Nepal
Flora of East Himalaya
Flora of Tibet
Plants described in 1859